I'll Still Love You is a compilation album by American recording artist Wanda Jackson. It was released in 1976 via DJM Records and contained a total of ten tracks. The album compiled previously-released country recordings, some of which were released as singles. Other tracks were released only on studio albums. The project was issued outside of the United States.

Background, content and release
Wanda Jackson previously had commercial success with a series of charting Rockabilly and country singles. Songs like "Let's Have a Party", "In the Middle of a Heartache" and "The Box It Came In" had reached both the country and pop charts. Once discovering Christianity in 1971, Jackson chose to focus more on gospel music and signed with Word Records in 1973. The label also allowed her to record country material, which was also released during the same period. I'll Still Love You compiled Jackson's previously-released country recordings. The songs were recorded between 1973 and 1975 at the Jack Clement Studio in sessions held by producer Billy Ray Hearn.

I'll Still Love You consisted of ten tracks. Some of the album's material had previously been released on Jackson's studio albums. Jackson's covers of "Slippin' Away", "Everybody's Had the Blues" and "Snowbird" first appeared on the 1974 studio album When It's Time to Fall in Love Again. "Jesus Put a Yodel in My Soul" had first appeared on her 1975 studio album Now I Have Everything.

Release and singles
I'll Still Love You was released in 1976 on DJM Records, a British independent record label. The record was released outside North America. It was issued as a vinyl LP, with five songs on each side of the disc. It marked Jackson's first DJM album release and her twelfth compilation album release overall. Prior to the record's release and following its release, a series of singles were issued that not previously been included on any of Jackson's studio albums. In 1974, "Where Do I Put His Memory" was released as a single via Myrrh Records but was not included on an album until I'll Still Love You. This was followed in similar fashion by 1975's "I Can't Stand to Hear You Say Goodbye", which was first released on ABC Records. The album's title track was released as a single around the same time as the album's release in 1976.

Track listing

Personnel
All credits are adapted from the liner notes of I'll Still Love You.

Musical personnel
 Joseph Babcock – Background vocals
 Jerry Carrigan – Drums
 Ray Edenton – Guitar
 Dolores Edgin – Background vocals
 Wanda Jackson – Lead vocals
 Weldon Myrick – Steel guitar
 June Page – Background vocals
 Billy Sanford – Guitar
 Jerry Shook – Guitar
 Jerry Smith – Piano
 Henry Strzelecki – Bass
 Bergen White – Background vocals
 Jack Williams – Guitar
 Hurshel Winginton – Background vocals

Technical personnel
 Billy Ray Hearn – Producer
 Farrell Morris – Percussion
 Charlie Tallent – Engineer

Release history

References

1976 compilation albums
DJM Records albums
Wanda Jackson compilation albums